Deborah Lee Carrington (December 14, 1959 March 23, 2018) was an American actress and stuntwoman. Her best known movie roles include playing a Martian rebel in Total Recall, an Ewok in Return of the Jedi (and in subsequent TV movies) and an elf in The Polar Express.

Carrington's film career began in college when she replied to an ad for extras in a newsletter published by Little People of America for Under the Rainbow, a film about the Munchkins from The Wizard of Oz.

Early life and career
Carrington was born in San Jose, California. She had a brother, Robert, and sister, Kathy. In 1981 she answered a casting call for Under The Rainbow while attending college at University of California, Davis. She took a break from her studies after landing a role in the film, but later returned and earned a degree in early childhood development.

Carrington appeared in many films and TV shows, including In Living Color, The Drew Carey Show, Howard the Duck, Tracey Takes On..., Men in Black, Seinfeld, Baywatch, Married... with Children, Boston Legal, The Garbage Pail Kids Movie, Dexter, and Bones. In 2008, she filmed scenes for the action thriller Bitch Slap. She also performed as a stunt double – often for child actors and dolls that had come to life – in films like Titanic and the Child's Play slasher film series.

Carrington was born with dwarfism and said she had experienced prejudicial attitudes as a dwarf in Hollywood. She supported other dwarf actors, insisting that they received credit for their work, since many costume-specific parts often went uncredited.

By the 1990s, Carrington began to push back against being typecast in costume-only roles. On television, she played character roles like Tiny Avenger on In Living Color, Tammy in Seinfeld, and Doreen in The Drew Carey Show. Additionally, in 1990, she was photographed by Peter Lindbergh for Vogue Italia with supermodel Helena Christensen.

Death
Carrington died on March 23, 2018, at age 58 in her parents' home in Pleasanton, California following a period of health complications.

Filmography

References

External links

1959 births
2018 deaths
Actors with dwarfism
American film actresses
American television actresses
Actresses from San Jose, California
University of California, Davis alumni
21st-century American women